The men's freestyle featherweight was a freestyle wrestling event held as part of the Wrestling at the 1924 Summer Olympics programme. It was the fourth appearance of the event. Featherweight was the second-lightest category, including wrestlers weighing from 56 kilograms to 61 kilograms.

Results
Source: Official results; Wudarski

Gold medal round

Silver medal round

Bronze medal round

References

Wrestling at the 1924 Summer Olympics